The 2010 Mato Grosso do Sul gubernatorial election was held on October 3, 2010, to elect the next governor of Mato Grosso do Sul. The PMDB's incumbent Governor André Puccinelli won election to a second term.

Candidates

Election results

References 

2010 Brazilian gubernatorial elections
October 2010 events in South America
Mato Grosso do Sul gubernatorial elections